Marco Gabriel Damasceno Alves (born 11 April 1996), known as Marco Damasceno, is a Brazilian footballer who plays as an attacking midfielder for Caldense.

Club career
Born in Brasília, Distrito Federal, Damasceno joined Atlético Paranaense's youth setup in 2011, after representing a Santos youth school in his hometown. He also had trials at Braga and Real Madrid in 2010, but nothing came of it.

Damasceno made his first team – and Série A – debut on 20 September 2014, coming on as a second-half substitute for fellow youth graduate Marcos Guilherme in a 0–1 home loss against Internacional.

References

External links

Marco Damasceno at ZeroZero

1996 births
Living people
Footballers from Brasília
Brazilian footballers
Association football midfielders
Campeonato Brasileiro Série A players
Campeonato Brasileiro Série D players
Club Athletico Paranaense players
Sampaio Corrêa Futebol Clube players
Sport Club Internacional players
Londrina Esporte Clube players
Grêmio Osasco Audax Esporte Clube players
Associação Ferroviária de Esportes players
Sobradinho Esporte Clube players
Associação Atlética Caldense players